Padidan (also spelled Pad Idan) is a town in Naushahro Feroze district of Sindh province in Pakistan.

Padidan lies in jurisdiction of Noshero Feroz district. Padidan is located in the central part of Sindh along the main railway track. Padidan is also connected with Sukkur and Karachi by the main National Highway (Motor way) N-5 which is about 18 km from Padidan. The main railway line up to Peshawar and down to Karachi is the main transportation rout of citizens.

Padidan has a population of over 25,000, and a traditional Sindhi culture. The Shalwar Kameez is a common dress, many women wear Hijabs as well. Sindhi language is common here and Pakistan People's Party (PPP) is strong in the region.

While agriculture is the main source of employment for the rural population of the town, in the urban areas people are engaged in wider variety of employment, both private and government-run. The main livelihood for the town is agricultural, 70% of the population is involved in agricultural activities. Padidan city is the main trading center of this district.

During the 2022 monsoon rainfall season, Padidan has received record breaking epic level of unprecedented rains about 1,722mm since July. The rains caused flash floods as many as 23 Talukas (sub-divisions) of Sindh provision which created climatic-inducted calamity and displaced as many as 20 million people around Sindh province.

Government and Infrastructure 
Pardidan has an Office of Town Committee which is responsible for managing the administration setup. Government facilities in Padidan include the Padidan Basic Health Unit, Padidan Railway Station, Padidan Police Station, Pakistan Meteorological Department, among others.

Education of the town is very poor, so many private schools are available though quality is quite low. Only a single boys and girls high school is present, for the graduation students have to move forward about 18–80 km.

The town is currently facing multiple issues, such as narrow roads which cause traffic congestion in the peak hours. No academy is available for graduation studies. Poor solid waste management has resulted in severe diseases within the community. The town has only one single Basic Health Unit (BHU) which is not sufficient for the town's population. A convention hall is not available for the population of the town either, hindering the ability of the citizens to discuss issues.

References

Naushahro Feroze District